The 1995–96 CHL season was the fourth season of the Central Hockey League (CHL).

Regular season

League standings

Note: y - clinched league title; x - clinched playoff spot; e - eliminated from playoff contention

Playoffs

Playoff bracket

CHL awards

Player statistics

Scoring leaders
Note: GP = Games played; G = Goals; A = Assists; Pts = Points; PIM = Penalty minutes

External links
 1995–96 CHL season at The Internet Hockey Database

Chl Season, 1995-96
Central Hockey League seasons